The Tees Valley Mohawks are an English basketball club in Middlesbrough, North Yorkshire, which plays in the National Basketball League Division 3, the fourth tier of British basketball. Their home venue is Middlesbrough College.

History
The Mohawks are arguably the most successful basketball club from the area, having won numerous national trophies. Their most successful period was in the early 2000s, in that time winning the 1999-00, 2001-02 and 2002-03 Division 1 league titles, 2002-03 and 2003-04 Division 1 Playoff titles and winning the National Trophy four consecutive times from 1999 to 2003. Their most recent success was the 2008 Patrons Cup.

Success dried up, and following relegation from Division 1 and after a season in Division 2 , the club took a short hiatus, focusing on developing their youth system. The club re-entered the National Basketball League in 2019, playing in the reorganised Division 3.

Notable former players
 
 
 
 
 
 
 
 
 
 
  Charles Smith

Season-by-season records

Note: Until 2003, the National Cup was competed for by the professional clubs of the British Basketball League as well as National League clubs. Since 2003-04, the competition has been competed for only by National League clubs, after the creation of the BBL Cup.

External links
Official Tees Valley Mohawks website
Basketball England website

Basketball teams in England
Sport in Middlesbrough
Basketball teams established in 1997
1997 establishments in England